The siege of Namur (21 November - 2 December 1792) took place during the Flanders campaign of the War of the First Coalition. The Army of the Ardennes under the Count of Valence captured the city which was then part of the Austrian Netherlands.

Background 
After the Battle of Jemappes, the Count of Valence divided his forces and sent  35,000 men towards the Meuse. A detachment entered Liège on November 28 under the acclamations of the inhabitants; the rest was sent to undertake the siege of Namur.

Due to the proximity of the Austrian army under Johann Peter Beaulieu, Valence devoted this operation to the Army of the Ardennes which would be reinforced by the Harville division. Beaulieu, avoiding battle with the Army of the Ardennes, fell back towards the Aische Forest. Three French brigades encamped around the citadel of Namur awaiting the arrival of their artillery from the Fortress of Charlemont near Givet. The strategist Antoine-Henri Jomini pointed out that by advancing more quickly, Valence could have trapped the entire Austrian army which he did not, allowing Beaulieu and his force to escape.

Battle 
On 21 November, the main town opened its doors and surrendered; however the Austrians still held the citadel with 2,300 well-supplied men. The trench was opened on November 27 and the bombardment began using the artillery that arrived  from Givet. Under heavy French bombardment, the citadel capitulated on December 2 and Valence took the garrison prisoner.

References

Literature 
 .

External links

History of Namur (city)
Flanders Campaign 1793–94
Sieges of the French Revolutionary Wars
1792 in military history
1792 in the Habsburg monarchy
1792 in the Holy Roman Empire